The 1977 Portland Timbers season was the third season for the Portland Timbers in the now-defunct North American Soccer League.

Squad  
The 1977 squad

North American Soccer League

Pacific Conference, Western Division standings 

Pld = Matches played; W = Matches won; L = Matches lost; GF = Goals for; GA = Goals against; GD = Goal difference; Pts = PointsSource:

League results 

* = Shootout winSource:

References

1977
Portland Timbers
Portland Timbers
1977 in sports in Oregon
1977 in Portland, Oregon